Oddgeir Bruaset (born 10 December 1944) is a Norwegian journalist and non-fiction writer.

Bruaset was born in Rauma, and was assigned with the Norwegian Broadcasting Corporation from 1971 to 2014. He is particularly known for hosting the television documentary series, Der ingen skulle tru at nokon kunne bu, about people who live far off the beaten track. His books include Folket langs Storfjorden (two volumes, 1991 and 2004), Orkanen from  1992, Jostedalsbreen from  1996, and Sunnmøre og sunnmøringen from  1999. He won a Gullruten award in 2009, and the Gullruten honorary award in 2015. In 2009 he was awarded the King's Medal of Merit.

References

1944 births
Living people
People from Rauma, Norway
Norwegian journalists
NRK people
Norwegian non-fiction writers
Norwegian nature writers